Yang Xiaotian (born 26 March 1990 in Xi'an) is a Chinese professional footballer who currently plays for Chinese Super League club Cangzhou Mighty Lions.

Club career
Yang Xiaotian was born in Xi'an and moved to Lianyungang with his parents when he was a primary school student. Yang started his professional career with Chinese Super League side Jiangsu Sainty in 2010. He was sent to Serie A club Parma for further training along with his teammate Qu Cheng between February 2012 and March 2012. He made his senior debut on 14 April 2013, in a 3–0 away defeat against Guizhou Renhe, coming on as a substitute for Jiang Jiajun in the 46th minute. On 17 September 2014, he scored his first goal for Jiangsu in a 2–1 win against Harbin Yiteng.

Career statistics 
Statistics accurate as of match played 4 January 2022.

Honours

Club
Jiangsu Sainty
 Chinese FA Cup: 2015
 Chinese FA Super Cup: 2013

References

External links
 

1990 births
Living people
Chinese footballers
Sportspeople from Xi'an
Footballers from Shaanxi
Jiangsu F.C. players
Chinese Super League players
Association football defenders